Alison Brooks,  (born 29 December 1962) is a Canadian-British architect. She is the founder and creative director of Alison Brooks Architects, based in London. Her awards include the RIBA Stirling Prize, Manser Medal, Stephen Lawrence Prize, and RIBA House of the Year.

Her designs include the Exeter College Cohen Quad at Oxford University, Smile at the Chelsea College of Arts, Accordia Brass Building and Sky Villas, and Windward House. In 2018 Brooks was invited to contribute to the Venice Architecture Biennale. Alison Brooks Architects won Dezeen Architect of the Year 2020.

Biography and early career
Brooks was born and lived her early years in Welland, Canada, but moved city in Ontario to Guelph where she attended John F Ross high school. She finished her studies in architecture with a BES and BArch at the University of Waterloo in 1988. Brooks moved to the UK and worked with designer Ron Arad, becoming a partner at Ron Arad Associates in 1991. With Arad, Brooks co-designed the Foyer of the Tel Aviv Opera. Other projects included the restaurants Belgo Noord and Belgo Centraal. Alison Brooks founded her practice Alison Brooks Architects in 1996, receiving a breakout commission a year later to design a hotel interior on the German island of Helgoland.

Private residences and housing 
Notable private residences completed in the 2000s include VXO House, Wrap House and Salt House. Brooks' architecture of this period was described by Jonathan Glancey as "a late flowering of the most elegant and sensuous modernism".

Alison Brooks Architects’ Sky Villas and Brass Building in the 2008 Stirling Prize-winning Accordia, Cambridge masterplan paved the way for work in housing. Notable projects include the Stirling Prize-shortlisted Newhall Be Albert Crescent in Bath, and the 2018 Mies Van Der Rohe Award finalist Ely Court in London. Residential projects currently under construction include Cadence Kings Cross and One Ashley Road in London, as well as Rubicon and Knight's Park in Cambridge.

Windward House in Gloucester, also called House on the Hill, won both the RIBA House of the year and the AJ Manser Medal in 2021. Simon Allford, president of the Royal Institute of British Architects, stated, "This is an extraordinary labour of love in architectural form. Every detail has been meticulously considered and exquisitely finished, resulting in a truly remarkable home that enhances its unique setting."

Cultural and higher education buildings 
 
Quarterhouse in Folkestone, Brooks’ first building for the performing arts, was completed in 2009. The building's notable fluted mesh cladding was inspired by the maritime iconography of Fokestone, the translucency of local scallop shells, and the stage curtains that the building would house. Exeter College, Oxford’s 6000 square metre Cohen Quadrangle also featured an innovative cladding and opened its doors to students in 2017, winning multiple awards for education building design. Rowan Moore, The Guardian’s architecture critic, described the new Quad as, ‘A tour de force that puts people first.’

Design for the new entrance building and porters lodge of Homerton College, Cambridge is in its final stages. Alison Brooks Architects was shortlisted, from close to 200 international expressions of interest, to redevelop the London School of Economics’ 43 Lincolns Inn Fields into the new Firoz Lalji Global Hub.

Exhibitions, installations and furniture 
‘The Smile’ was a Project for the 2016 London Design Festival; a public pavilion in the Chelsea College of Art (UAL) Parade ground that showcased the structural and spatial potential of cross–laminated hardwood using American tulipwood. ARUP Engineer Andrew Lawrence described The Smile as, ‘The most complex CLT structure that has ever been built.’ For Brooks, it was the opportunity the stretch the new ‘wonder material’ to the limit whilst demonstrating that the 21st century is an era not of concrete, but of timber.

Alison Brooks Architects has contributed to the International Architecture Exhibition of La Biennale di Venezia four times. 'ReCasting', the practice's notable installation at the 2018 Biennale simulated the critical freespaces of work in housing as four inhabitable 'totems': Threshold, Inhabited Edge, Passage and Roofspace. 'Home Ground' was Alison Brooks Architects' contribution to the Biennale Architettura 2021 in Venice. Situated in the Arsenale, the installation explored how housing defines the way we live together in cities; as households, and by sharing collective ground. The practice's work also featured in the central Biennale Pavilion's 'Future Assembly'.

In 2014 Brooks joined forces with furniture designer Felix de Pass to create a stool for the kitchen as part of a collaborative series for the London Design Festival.

Housing as a social project 
Alison Brooks Architects have worked to advocate towards housing through community buildings by designing mixed-income housing projects. In the London borough of Brent, the Ely Court (completed in 2015) stands as a notable example. The rundown building was replaced with three mid-rise buildings filled with 43 residential rooms. Her design allows for increased social engagement, particularly by providing spaces open to the public. Other high density, low rise projects with affordable housing units include Newhall Be (Harlow) and Unity Place (London). Brooks advocates for "delivering along with new buildings a sense of civic pride and social rejuvenation," helping to aid and promote inclusiveness and social diversity. "Housing is the social project of architecture, it frames everyday life; it forms people's world view," says Brooks.

Awards and recognition 
Brooks is the only architect of the UK to have won all three of the RIBA awards: the RIBA Stephen Lawrence Prize (for The Wrap House, in 2006), the RIBA Manser Medal (in 2014 for the Lens House),and the RIBA Stirling Prize for their part in the design of Accordia, a high-density development of 378 residential rooms.

In March 2013, Brooks received the Architects' Journals Woman Architect of the Year Award. One of the judges, Paul Monaghan, said: "Her mixture of sculpture, architecture and detail is what has made her such a powerful force in British architecture."

In 2016, she designed Smile, a temporary cantilevered wooden structure on the grounds of the Chelsea School of Art, demonstrating the structural feasibility of Cross laminated timber. This architecture-art hybrid "pushed the boundaries of hardwood engineering" by using only 12 panels of cross-laminated American tulipwood.

Published works 
Brooks revealed some of her processes, techniques, and themes in her published work Synthesis: Culture and Context in 2014.

21 years after the founding of Alison Brooks Architects, Brooks published Ideals then Ideas.

In 2018, the Harvard Business Review published an article co-authored by Brooks, "The Surprising Power of Questions: It Goes Far Beyond Exchanging Information."

See also
 List of University of Waterloo people

References

External links

 Alison Brooks Architects

Living people
1962 births
Stirling Prize laureates
Canadian women architects
20th-century Canadian architects
21st-century Canadian architects
20th-century Canadian women
Royal Designers for Industry